Wyatt Houston (born June 21, 1994) is an American football tight end who is currently a free agent. He played college football at Utah State. He signed with the Kansas City Chiefs as an undrafted free agent in 2017.

College career 
Houston played college football at Utah State where he was ranked second all-time in receptions by recording 86 of the receptions for 933 career yards receiving and 9 total touchdown receptions.

Professional career

Kansas City Chiefs 
Houston signed with the Kansas City Chiefs as an undrafted free agent on May 6, 2017, but was waived three days later.

Carolina Panthers 
On May 31, 2017, Houston signed with the Carolina Panthers. He was waived on July 29, 2017.

References

External links
Utah State Aggies bio

1994 births
Living people
People from Tualatin, Oregon
Players of American football from Oregon
American football tight ends
Utah State Aggies football players
Kansas City Chiefs players
Carolina Panthers players